Ameryka (the Polish spelling of "America") is the name of the following villages in Poland:
Ameryka, Lublin Voivodeship (east Poland)
Ameryka, Kartuzy County in Pomeranian Voivodeship (north Poland)
Ameryka, Słupsk County in Pomeranian Voivodeship (north Poland)
Ameryka, Warmian-Masurian Voivodeship (north Poland)
Ameryka, Opole Voivodeship (south Poland)

See also
Ameryka (magazine), Polish language edition of Amerika Russian language magazine, a propaganda publication distributed by the US during the Cold War